Baila conmigo, is a youth telenovela produced by Luis de Llano M for Televisa in 1992.

Eduardo Capetillo and Bibi Gaytán star as the main protagonists, while Paulina Rubio, Rafael Rojas and Claudia Islas star as the main antagonists.

Plot 
The story is set at the end of the 1950s in the era of the birth of rock and roll. The beautiful and popular Pilar falls for the ambitious Bruno, who only seeks adventure and fame. Andrea, Pilar's closest friend is also interested in him and decides to pursue a romance with him despite not being as attractive as Pilar. Also pursuing Pilar is handsome and kind-hearted singer, Eddy Lopez.

Cast 

 Bibi Gaytán as Pilar Armendia
 Eduardo Capetillo as Eddy López
 Paulina Rubio as Andrea de la Reguera
 Rafael Rojas as Bruno Ventura
 Alexis Ayala as Tomás de la Reguera
 Joaquín Cordero as Germán de la Reguera
 Claudia Islas as Nelly Moll
 Maria Victoria as Refugio
 Lucha Moreno as Johanna
 Stephanie Salas as Clarita / Clarissa
 Angelina Peláez as Rebeca
 Andrea Legarreta as Rebeca
 Mónica Prado as Cristina
 Rodrigo Vidal as Samuel
 Emilia Carranza as Julia
 Lorena Rojas as Rosario
 Sergio Jiménez as El Tuerto
 Anna Silvetti as Magdalena
 Rosario Zúñiga as Carolina
 Alicia Montoya as Marcela
 Magda Karina as Catalina
 José Juan as Plácido
 Abraham Stavans as Jacobo
 Mimí as Rosita
 Dacia González as Teresa
 Martha Ofelia Galindo as Lupe
 Martha Resnikoff as Sara
 Amparo Arozamena as Consuelo
 Mayra Rojas as Lety
 Giorgio Palacios as Sebastián Martínez
 Héctor Gómez as Fidel Guzmán
 Arturo Adonay as Sebastián "El Jairo"''
 Alejandro Treviño as Esteban "El Popotes"
 Angélica Ruvalcaba as Mary Jean (#1)
 María Rebeca as Mary Jean (#2)
 Gerardo Gallardo as Ricardo
 Oscar Traven as Adolfo
 Leonardo Daniel as Óscar del Prado

Music

The soundtrack was released in 1992. It features various artists such as Eduardo Capetillo, Bibi Gaytán, Paulina Rubio and Stephanie Salas.

Track listing
 "BAILA CONMIGO EL ROCK AND ROLL" Eduardo Capetillo, Bibi Gaytán, Paulina Rubio, Stephanie Salas, El Gato, Gerardo Gallardo 
 "BAILA CONMIGO (DE CACHETITO)" Andrea Legarreta, Rodrigo Vidal
 "OLVÍDAME"   Bibi Gaytán
 "MARY JEAN" Gerardo Gallardo 
 "TONTERÍAS (Sweet Nothings)" Stephanie Salas  
 "QUE TRISTE ES EL PRIMER ADIÓS (Breaking up is hard to do)" Bibi Gaytán  
 "TE QUIERO AMAR" El Gato (Rafael Rojas)   
 "BAILA CONMIGO"  
 "ALGUIEN NOS QUIERE JUNTOS" Angélica Ruvalcaba 
 "SI ES AMOR"
 "SUEÑA Y BAILA CONMIGO" Paulina Rubio  
 "COMO LA VAMOS A PASAR"  Rafael Rojas

References

External links 

1992 telenovelas
1992 Mexican television series debuts
1992 Mexican television series endings
Mexican telenovelas
Televisa telenovelas
Spanish-language telenovelas